The Khazar Lankaran 2011–12 season was Khazar Lankaran's seventh Azerbaijan Premier League season. They finished second in the 2011–12 Azerbaijan Premier League, qualifying for the 2012–13 UEFA Europa League again. In the 2011–12 UEFA Europa League they entered, and were knocked out, at the Second Qualifying Round by Maccabi Tel Aviv of Israel. They also took part in the 2011–12 Azerbaijan Cup getting knocked out at the Quarterfinal stage by Inter Baku.

Khazar started the season under Mircea Rednic, but he was sacked and replaced the next day by Cüneyt Biçer. Biçer was then sacked on 15 March 2012 and replaced by Yunis Hüseynov.

Squad 

 

 (captain)

Transfers

Summer

In:

Out:

Winter

In:

Out:

Competitions

Azerbaijan Premier League

Results summary

Results by round

Results

Table

Azerbaijan Premier League Championship Group

Results

Table

Azerbaijan Cup

UEFA Europa League

Qualifying phase

Squad statistics

Appearances and goals

|-
|colspan="14"|Players who appeared for Khazar no longer at the club:

|}

Goal scorers

Disciplinary record

Monthly awards

Annual awards

Team kit
These are the 2011–12 Khazar Lankaran kits.

|
|

References

External links 
 Khazar Lankaran at Soccerway.com

Khazar Lankaran
Khazar Lankaran FK seasons
Khazar Lankaran